Viscaria is a genus of flowering plants in the family Caryophyllaceae, native to Canada, Greenland, Iceland, Europe, Kazakhstan, and western Siberia. Molecular studies attempting to resolve relationships in the tribe Sileneae have found that Viscaria is closely genetically related to the genus Atocion, but is quite distinct from it morphologically.

Species
Currently accepted species include:

Viscaria alpina (L.) G.Don
Viscaria asterias (Griseb.) Frajman
Viscaria × media Fr. ex Svanlund
Viscaria vulgaris Röhl.

References

Caryophyllaceae
Caryophyllaceae genera